The 1985–86 Oklahoma Sooners men's basketball team represented the University of Oklahoma in competitive college basketball during the 1985–86 NCAA Division I men's basketball season. The Oklahoma Sooners men's basketball team played its home games in the Lloyd Noble Center and was a member of the National Collegiate Athletic Association's (NCAA) former Big Eight Conference at that time.

After winning 17 straight (and 21 of 22) to begin the season – peaking at No. 5 in the AP poll, the team posted a 26–9 overall record and a 8–6 conference record, finishing 5th in the Big 8 standings. The Sooners received a bid to the 1986 NCAA Tournament, and advanced to the second round where they fell to DePaul.

Roster

Schedule and results

|-
!colspan=9 style=| Non-Conference Regular Season

|-
!colspan=9 style=| Big 8 Regular Season

|-
!colspan=9 style=| Big 8 Tournament

|-
!colspan=9 style=| NCAA Tournament

Rankings

1986 NBA draft

References

Oklahoma Sooners men's basketball seasons
Oklahoma
Oklahoma